Procopius II (died 1880) was Greek Orthodox Patriarch of Jerusalem (December 28, 1872 – 1875).

1880 deaths
19th-century Greek Orthodox Patriarchs of Jerusalem